CNO may refer to:
 C/N0, the carrier-to-noise-density ratio of a signal
 Casualty notification officer, a person responsible for informing relatives of death or injury
 Chief networking officer, a business role
 Chief nursing officer, a nursing management position
 Chief of Naval Operations, the head of the United States Navy 
 Chino Airport, in California, IATA symbol: CNO
 Chronic nuisance ordinance, a law that aims to evict tenants for reporting crime
 Cis-Neptunian object, an astronomical body within the orbit of Neptune
 CNO cycle, a stellar nuclear fusion reaction
 Coconut oil, an edible oil
 Computer network operations, the optimization and use of digital telecommunications
 CNO Financial Group, an American financial services holding company
 CNO (gene), which encodes the protein cappuccino homolog
 Clozapine N-oxide, a synthetic ligand which activates a receptor
 Fulminate, a chemical compound containing the  ion